Diego de Souza Simões (born 18 January 1991) is a Brazilian footballer. He also holds a Portuguese passport.

Biography
Born in Brazil, Simões started his Italy career in Calcio Padova. He was the member of U17 team in 2006–07 season. and 2007–08 season. In October 2008, he was absent from training without leave and FIGC imposed a minor sentence, as he had an excuse of visiting injured relatives in London. He then returned to Brazil for Palmeiras and Grêmio on loan while his registration rights were held by his agent Pedrinho VRP via Campo Grande.

In 2010, he returned to Padova On 9 April, he replaced Claudio Matias Cuffa in the last minutes and made his Serie B debut. That match was a 0–0 draw with Salernitana. He wore shirt number 69 that season.

In August 2010, he was loaned to Carpi.

References

External links
 Grêmio Profile 
 Carpi Profile 
 CBF 
 Football.it Profile 

1991 births
Brazilian footballers
Association football midfielders
Brazilian expatriate footballers
Brazilian expatriate sportspeople in Italy
Calcio Padova players
Campo Grande Atlético Clube players
A.C. Carpi players
Expatriate footballers in Italy
Grêmio Foot-Ball Porto Alegrense players
Living people
Sportspeople from Minas Gerais
Serie B players
Sociedade Esportiva Palmeiras players